Modiran Vehicle Manufacturing Company (MVM) is an Iranian automobile firm.

History
MVM is a subsidiary of Kerman Motor, an Iranian assembler of Volkswagens, that also used to assemble a version of the Daewoo Matiz for the local market. The Matiz had been assembled by Kerman Khodro since the year 2000 in a joint venture with the South Korean Daewoo Company. However the crisis at Daewoo Motor in South Korea resulted in a take-over by the American General Motors corporation which then stopped supplying CKD kits to the Iranian company due to U.S. sanctions against the government of Iran for claims about the Iranian state sponsoring terrorism and Iranian violations of United Nations protocols for nuclear inspections. It is offered with two engine options, a 3-cylinder 0.8 liter and a 4-cylinder 1.1 liter. Due to this, Kerman Khodro licensed the Chery QQ3 as the car was of a similar style to the GM car. However as Kerman Khodro had replaced the GM Daewoo lines with that of Volkswagen, they put it into production at their subsidiary MVM as the 110. It is offered with two engine options, a 3-cylinder 0.8 liter and a 4-cylinder 1.1 liter.

Current models

MVM 

MVM X22 Pro - crossover SUV
MVM X55 Pro - crossover SUV
MVM Arrizo 5 T IE
MVM Tiggo 7 - crossover SUV

Fownix 

Fownix Arrizo 6 Pro
Fownix Tiggo 7 Pro - crossover SUV
Fownix Tiggo 8 Pro - crossover SUV
Fownix FX - crossover SUV

Notes

External links 
Official Website (MVM)
Official Website (Fownix)
Chery Website in Iran

MVM
Manufacturing companies based in Tehran